Newhall  is the southernmost and oldest community in the city of Santa Clarita, California.  Prior to the 1987 consolidation of Canyon Country, Saugus, Newhall, and Valencia into the city of Santa Clarita, it was an unincorporated area.  It was the first permanent town in the Santa Clarita Valley.

History

The Tataviam village of Tochonanga was located at the area where Newhall stands today. Fifty villagers were brought to Mission San Fernando from 1797 to 1811. Descendants of the village continued to live in the Newhall area.

Named after businessman Henry Mayo Newhall, Newhall is home to the William S. Hart County Park, featuring tours of the famous silent movie maker's mansion. Newhall is also home to the Pioneer Oil Refinery (California Historical Landmark, No. 172), the oldest surviving oil refinery in the world and the first commercially successful refinery in California. Over the years, Newhall has been the location for many movies, including Suddenly (1954) and Disney's The World's Greatest Athlete (1973). The TV-series The Magnificent Seven was also for the most part filmed in Newhall.

The Lyons Station Stagecoach Stop was located at what is now Eternal Valley Cemetery near the intersection of Newhall Avenue and Sierra Highway in east Newhall.

On April 6, 1970, four California Highway Patrol officers were shot dead during a traffic stop of two heavily armed career criminals. The incident was known as the Newhall incident, although it took place in present-day Valencia. This led to increased emphasis on officer safety both within the CHP and nationwide.

Education
The Master's University, a non-denominational Christian liberal arts university, is located in Newhall.

At the elementary school level, Newhall is almost entirely served by the Newhall School District, except for the far northeastern portion (bordering Canyon Country) which is served by the Sulphur Springs School District. At the middle and high school levels, Newhall is served by Placerita and La Mesa Junior High Schools, and Hart and Golden Valley High Schools, all part of the William S. Hart Union High School District.

Old Town Newhall

The historic district of Old Town Newhall (a.k.a. Downtown Newhall) is a major cultural and business center. It contains many independent restaurants, stores, and theaters, as well as a public library. Notable businesses in Old Town Newhall include Newhall Refinery (a gastropub), Newhall Press Room, The Old Town Junction, Brewery Draconum, Jazmin's Bakery, Commando Military Surplus, Pulchella Winery, National Glass, The Schiitr (a home audio store), Placerita Liquor, Santa Clarita Valley Food Pantry, and Hotel Lexen. The areas surrounding Old Town Newhall are predominantly Hispanic, and there are many Mexican restaurants including La Charrita, El Pueblo, El Taco Llama, and El Pariente. Theaters in Old Town Newhall include Canyon Theater Guild, The Main, and Laemmle. The Old Town Newhall Farmers Market is located on the grounds of the public library. Other notable sites in the area include the William S. Hart Park; Newhall DMV; Newhall Elementary School (part of the Newhall School District); Newhall Metrolink station; Newhall Terrace, Newhall Crossings, and Californian apartment complexes; Veterans Historical Plaza; First Presbyterian Church of Newhall; Unity Center mosque; Newhall Community Center; and the historic Saugus Train Station (Heritage Junction). The official Old Town Newhall website describes it as "Santa Clarita's premier arts and entertainment district." The Hart and Main wedding and event venue is scheduled to open in spring 2022. Some of the recent developments in Old Town Newhall have been described as gentrification.

Climate
This region experiences hot and dry summers, along with mild, rainy winters.  According to the Köppen Climate Classification system, Newhall has a warm-summer Mediterranean climate, abbreviated "Csa" on climate maps.

Notable people
Gene Autry, singing cowboy actor
Jake Bird (born 1995), Major League Baseball pitcher for the Colorado Rockies 
Trevor Brown, Major League Baseball catcher
 Tyler Glasnow, Major League Baseball pitcher
 William S. Hart, silent film star 
 Andrew Lorraine, Major League Baseball pitcher
 Eddie Mekka, actor
James Shields, Major League Baseball pitcher
 Brady White, college football quarterback

See also

References

Notes

External links

  (Photos, text, TV shows)
 Newhall Information on SantaClarita.com
 Hub for Newhall history and redevelopment info

Neighborhoods in Santa Clarita, California